Shawn Christopher Respert (born February 6, 1972) is an American professional basketball coach and former player. He attended Bishop Borgess High School, and he came to prominence while playing college basketball at Michigan State. He played professionally in the National Basketball Association (NBA) for four seasons from 1995 to 1999.

College career
Respert was a standout at Michigan State. He and point guard Eric Snow combined to form one of the nation's most prolific backcourt tandems for head coach Jud Heathcote's Spartans. Respert was the team's leading scorer all four seasons at Michigan State and finished his career second all-time in scoring among Big Ten players with 2,531 points (trailing only Calbert Cheaney) and first in Big Ten games with 1,545 points scored. He capped a brilliant career by being named a unanimous first team All-American and Big Ten Player of the Year and Sporting News and NABC National Player of the Year with a 25.6 scoring average during his 1994–95 senior season. He left East Lansing as the Spartans all-time leading scorer and began the tradition of out-going seniors kissing the logo at center court during their final home game.

College statistics

|-
| align="left" | 1990–91
| align="left" | Michigan State
| 1 || - || 3.0 || .000 || .000 || .000 || 0.0 || 0.0 || 0.0 || 0.0 || 0.0
|-
| align="left" | 1991–92
| align="left" | Michigan State
| 30 || 30 || 31.8 || .503 || .455 || .872 || 2.1 || 2.1 || 1.1 || 0.1 || 15.8
|-
| align="left" | 1992–93
| align="left" | Michigan State
| 28 || 28 || 34.3 || .481 || .429 || .856 || 4.0 || 2.6 || 0.9 || 0.2 || 20.1
|-
| align="left" | 1993–94
| align="left" | Michigan State
| 32 || 31 || 33.6 || .484 || .449 || .840 || 4.0 || 2.5 || 1.3 || 0.2 || 24.3
|-
| align="left" | 1994–95
| align="left" | Michigan State
| 28 || 28 || 33.6 || .473 || .474 || .869 || 4.0 || 3.0 || 1.4 || 0.0 || 25.6
|- class="sortbottom"
| style="text-align:center;" colspan="2"| Career
| 119 || 117 || 33.0 || .484 || .454 || .857 || 3.5 || 2.5 || 1.2 || 0.1 || 21.3
|}

Professional career
Respert was selected by the Portland Trail Blazers in the 1st round, with the 8th overall pick, of the 1995 NBA Draft. The Blazers traded his NBA rights to the Milwaukee Bucks for the rights to Gary Trent and a first-round pick. Respert was traded to Toronto in his second year, where he scored 5.6 points a game. He next played briefly in Dallas the next season and then had a second stint with the Raptors. Respert finished his career in Phoenix during the 1998–99 season. He was under contract with Los Angeles Lakers for a brief period in October 2000 but was waived before playing in any NBA games for them. In his NBA career, Respert played in 172 games and scored a total of 851 points on averages of 4.9 points in 13.7 minutes per game.

He played professionally in Italy for Adecco Milano (1999–2000) and Fillattice Imola (2001–2002). He also played in Poland for Spójnia Stargard Szczeciński (2002–2003).

Respert had stomach cancer but did not admit it until 2005. He started being bothered with stomach cramps towards the end of his rookie season. He noticed a lump below his belly button even after changing his diet. Respert was diagnosed with cancer after undergoing a series of tests at Milwaukee's St. Joseph Regional Medical Center in May 1996. After confirmation through a second opinion, he underwent daily radiation therapy for three consecutive months, losing twenty pounds in the process. The only people who knew about this treatment were the Bucks' trainers, doctors, his coach Mike Dunleavy, Sr. and Michigan State backcourt partner Eric Snow. He only told a select few; not even his family and girlfriend knew, because "people don't want to hear excuses in pro sports, even if the excuse is cancer."

NBA career statistics

|-
| align="left" | 1995–96
| align="left" | Milwaukee
| 62 || 0 || 13.6 || .387 || .344 || .833 || 1.2 || 1.1 || 0.5 || 0.1 || 4.9
|-
| align="left" | 1996–97
| align="left" | Milwaukee
| 14 || 0 || 5.9 || .316 || .111 || 1.000 || 0.5 || 0.6 || 0.0 || 0.0 || 1.4
|-
| align="left" | 1996–97
| align="left" | Toronto
| 27 || 0 || 15.3 || .442 || .396 || .844 || 1.2 || 1.2 || 0.7 || 0.1 || 5.6
|-
| align="left" | 1997–98
| align="left" | Toronto
| 47 || 4 || 14.8 || .450 || .373 || .815 || 1.6 || 0.9 || 0.6 || 0.0 || 5.5
|-
| align="left" | 1997–98
| align="left" | Dallas
| 10 || 0 || 21.5 || .429 || .231 || .571 || 2.7 || 1.7 || 0.5 || 0.0 || 8.2
|-
| align="left" | 1998–99
| align="left" | Phoenix
| 12 || 1 || 8.3 || .361 || .308 || .700 || 1.1 || 0.7 || 0.4 || 0.0 || 3.1
|- class="sortbottom"
| style="text-align:center;" colspan="2"| Career
| 172 || 5 || 13.7 || .414 || .340 || .816 || 1.3 || 1.0 || 0.5 || 0.0 || 4.9
|}

Coaching career
Respert became a volunteer coach at Prairie View A&M in Texas in 2004. In early 2005, he was hired to be director of basketball operations at Rice University for 2 years. He then spent two years as the director of player development of the NBA's minor league, the NBA Development League. In September 2008, he was hired by the Houston Rockets as the director of player programs. On December 6, 2011, Respert was hired by the Minnesota Timberwolves as a player development coach. He was named an assistant coach by the Memphis Grizzlies in September 2013. Respert then moved to the Chicago Bulls as a director of player development in 2018. His tenure with the Bulls lasted until the end of the 2019–20 season when his contract expired.

Notes

References

External links

 TheDraftReview.com - Respert's NBA Draft History Page
 Article on Respert's struggle with stomach cancer
College Stats

1972 births
Living people
20th-century African-American sportspeople
21st-century African-American sportspeople
African-American basketball players
All-American college men's basketball players
American expatriate basketball people in Canada
American expatriate basketball people in Greece
American expatriate basketball people in Italy
American expatriate basketball people in Poland
American men's basketball players
Andrea Costa Imola players
Basketball coaches from Michigan
Basketball players from Detroit
Bishop Borgess High School alumni
Competitors at the 1994 Goodwill Games
Dallas Mavericks players
Goodwill Games medalists in basketball
Greek Basket League players
Memphis Grizzlies assistant coaches
Michigan State Spartans men's basketball players
Milwaukee Bucks players
Near East B.C. players
Olimpia Milano players
Phoenix Suns players
Portland Trail Blazers draft picks
Shooting guards
Spójnia Stargard players
Toronto Raptors players
Universiade gold medalists for the United States
Universiade medalists in basketball